"Heaven's Door" is Beni's ninth single under the label Nayutawave Records. "Heaven's Door" is a "happy feeling mid-tempo wedding track". With this single came the promotion for Beni's wedding dress line named Rouge de Beni. The first press edition includes a photobook of Rouge de Beni.

Track list

Charts

Reported sales

References

2010 singles
Beni (singer) songs
2010 songs